Merchant Shipping (Minimum Standards) Convention, 1976 is  an International Labour Organization Convention.

It was established in 1976, with the preamble stating:
Having decided upon the adoption of certain proposals with regard to substandard vessels, particularly those registered under flags of convenience, ...

Ratifications
Protocol of 1996 to the Merchant Shipping (Minimum Standards) Convention, 1976

Having determined that these proposals should take the form of a Protocol to the principal Convention;

adopts, this twenty-second day of October one thousand nine hundred and ninety-six, the following Protocol, which may be cited as the Protocol of 1996 to the Merchant Shipping (Minimum Standards) Convention, 1976.

As of 2022, the convention had been ratified by 56 states. Of these ratifying states, 44 have subsequently denounced the convention.

External links 
Text.
Ratifications and denunciations.

International Labour Organization conventions
Treaties concluded in 1976
Treaties entered into force in 1981
Treaties of Albania
Treaties of Algeria
Treaties of Azerbaijan
Treaties of Barbados
Treaties of Belgium
Treaties of Belize
Treaties of Brazil
Treaties of Costa Rica
Treaties of Dominica
Treaties of Egypt
Treaties of Estonia
Treaties of West Germany
Treaties of Ghana
Treaties of Hungary
Treaties of Iceland
Treaties of India
Treaties of Ba'athist Iraq
Treaties of Ireland
Treaties of Israel
Treaties of Italy
Treaties of Japan
Treaties of Jordan
Treaties of Kyrgyzstan
Treaties of Lebanon
Treaties of Lithuania
Treaties of Peru
Treaties of Portugal
Treaties of Romania
Treaties of Seychelles
Treaties of Slovenia
Treaties of Tajikistan
Treaties of Trinidad and Tobago
Treaties of Ukraine
Treaties of the United Kingdom
Treaties of the United States
Treaties extended to Gibraltar
Treaties extended to the Isle of Man
Treaties extended to the British Virgin Islands
Treaties extended to Bermuda
Treaties extended to Anguilla
Treaties extended to the Falkland Islands
Admiralty law treaties
Treaties extended to Aruba
Treaties extended to American Samoa
Treaties extended to Guam
Treaties extended to Puerto Rico
Treaties extended to the Trust Territory of the Pacific Islands
Treaties extended to the United States Virgin Islands
Treaties extended to the Northern Mariana Islands
1976 in labor relations